In enzymology, a nucleoside-triphosphate diphosphatase is an enzyme that catalyzes the chemical reaction

a nucleoside triphosphate + H2O  a nucleotide + diphosphate

Thus, the two substrates of this enzyme are nucleoside triphosphate and H2O, whereas its two products are nucleotide and diphosphate.

This enzyme belongs to the family of hydrolases, specifically those acting on acid anhydrides in phosphorus-containing anhydrides.  The systematic name of this enzyme class is nucleoside-triphosphate diphosphohydrolase. This enzyme is also called nucleoside-triphosphate pyrophosphatase.  This enzyme participates in purine metabolism and pyrimidine metabolism.

For example, enzyme deoxyribonucleoside triphosphate pyrophosphatase, encoded by YJR069C in S. cerevisiae and exhibiting (d)ITPase and (d)XTPase activities, hydrolyses ITP, dITP, XTP and dXTP releasing pyrophosphate and IMP, dIMP, XMP and dXMP, respectively.

Structural studies

References

 

EC 3.6.1
Enzymes of known structure